The Wonhwa (original flowers)  were a class of female warrior cadets in 6th-century Silla, one of the Three Kingdoms of Korea.  It is not clear to what extent they ever engaged in battle.  Created in the reign of King Jinheung, the first group of Wonhwa consisted of about 300 young girls chosen for their beauty and skill.  Their leaders were two women.  However, after one of them committed murder, the wonhwa class was abolished, and replaced by the all-male Hwarang.

Subsequently, the Wonhwa title was granted to female spiritual leaders of the Hwarang. "The term Won Hwa is often incorrectly used to represent a single individual; in fact, Won Hwa was a group of highly revered Buddhist nuns who spiritually guided these Buddhist monastic warriors."

Some have suggested that wonhwa might be the origin of the later kisaeng class, but little evidence exists to support this theory.

The first two women to be nominated for Wonhwa were the leaders of the two bands of Wonhwa, Nammo (南毛) and Junjeong (俊貞), who grew jealous of one another. When Junjeong murdered her rival, the Wonhwa were disbanded. The tale goes that Junjeong asked Nammo to her house and forced her to drink, killing Nammo at the north stream. The people of Nammo searched for the missing Nammo and made a song so that the children could sing it in the streets. A group of these people found Nammo's body and Junjeong was executed.

This origin story is most likely based on myth and legend, as the term wonhwa is composed of won 源, "source", and undoubtedly refers to the founders of the sect, while hwa 花, "flower", is a euphemism for someone who has spent a great deal of time or money in the pursuit of something, i.e. a devotee. In the case of the Wonhwa, devotion to philosophy and the arts. Furthermore, while the names nammo and junjeong could have been appellations adopted by these two women for use in court, one cannot overlook the obvious descriptions they portray. Nammo hints at one who is careless yet lucky, or perhaps someone who is innately insightful and therefore lackadaisical about further erudition. Junjeung clearly indicates a person who is talented and virtuous, despite the fact that she was the one who succumbed to homicidal tendencies. It would be logical to assume that if someone had to work hard, maybe even struggle with attaining certain goals, that envy might consume them if their counterpart, especially if viewed more as a rival, seemed to reach the same objectives with substantially less effort.

See also
History of Korea
Hwarang

References

Korean warriors
Silla